Public value describes the value that an organization or activity contributes to society. The term was originally coined by Harvard professor Mark H. Moore who saw it as the equivalent of shareholder value in public management. Public value is supposed to provide managers with a notion of how entrepreneurial activity can contribute to the common good. Nowadays, public value is no longer limited to the public sector, but is used by all types of organization, including non-governmental organizations and private sector firms. Therefore, the public value researcher Timo Meynhardt from the University of St. Gallen and HHL Leipzig Graduate School of Management uses the term to generally raise the question about organizations' contribution to the common good. He believes that current management concepts, such as shareholder value, stakeholder value, customer value, sustainability or corporate social responsibility, should legitimize themselves in regard to their impact on the common good. In his (social-)psychological-based concept, public value emerges for individuals from the experiences made in social structures and relationships. Hence, it can be seen as a prerequisite and a resource for successful living.

Definitions

Public value is value for the public. It equates managerial success in the public sector with initiating and reshaping public sector enterprises in ways that increase their value to the public in both the short and the long run. Moore, 1995 According to a recent systematic review of empirical public value research, public value has four key dimensions: outcome achievement (i.e. the extent to which a public body is improving publicly valued outcomes across a wide variety of areas), trust and legitimacy (i.e. the extent to which an organisation and its activities are trusted and perceived to be legitimate by the public and by key stakeholders), service delivery quality (i.e the extent to which services are experienced as being delivered in high‐quality manner that is considerate of users’ needs), and efficiency (i.e. the extent to which an organisation is achieving maximal benefits with minimal resources).

Public values are those providing normative consensus about (1) the rights, benefits, and prerogatives to which citizens should (and should not) be entitled; (2) the obligations of citizens to society, the state and one another; and (3) the principles on which governments and policies should be based. Public Value is the combined view of the public about what they regard as valuable. Talbot, 2006. Value for the public is therefore situated in relationships between the individual and society, founded in individuals, constituted by subjective evaluations against basic needs, activated by and realized in emotional-motivational states, and produced and reproduced in experience-intense practices. Meynhardt, 2009

In the public sector

The research program on public value was kicked off by Professor Mark H. Moore of Harvard's Kennedy School of Government, who published a book on the subject, Creating Public Value. Strategic Management in Government, in 1995. In this sense, public value can be instituted as an organising principle in a public sector organisation, providing a focus in the context of which individual employees are free to pursue and propose new ideas about how to improve the working of the organisation, in terms of efficiency or services. Public organisations seeking to use public value as a principle need to create a corporate culture in which the pursuit of public values by employees is rewarded just as pursuing shareholder value is rewarded in private corporations.

The concept has been taken up initially by academics, think tanks and NGOs, and later by a number of public sector organisations in the United Kingdom and other countries.

In 2004 it was used by the BBC as the cornerstone of its manifesto for the renewal of its charter.

In 2006 Accenture launched the Institute for Public Service Value (IPSV), to explore how public value is created in government organizations. Greg Parston, co-founder and former Chief Executive of the Office for Public Management, and a collaborator with Professor Moore, was appointed Director. Among many other studies, IPSV conducted the Global Cities Forum in 2007-2009, which facilitated  citizens' deliberations on their experiences and expectations of public value in 17 cities around the world.

In 2006, the Center for Technology in Government (CTG) in partnership with SAP AG, conducted research on the topic of public value in the context of governments' investments in information technology (IT). The results of this research found that governments' ability to realize the full value of IT investments is not completely measurable in terms of financial results. More specifically, the five U.S. and international governments studied, looked for the full value of government IT investments in both the internal value to government operations and the broader political and social returns to the public at large.

From this point of view, there are two sources of public value: 
 value that results from improving the government itself as an asset to society and 
 value that results from the delivery of specific benefits directly to persons or groups.
In November 2006, UK-based The Work Foundation published a report on their project, titled Deliberative democracy and the role of public managers, followed in October 2008 by Public Value: The Next Steps in Public Service Reform

The German Federal Employment Agency uses the public value concept to better understand its contribution to society that goes beyond simple task fulfillment and make it a yardstick for management decisions. An empirical study has shown that a particular value of this organization is seen in its contribution to social peace in Germany.

In the private sector
Public value is also taken up by private sector companies that want to maintain a license to operate and understand what implications new strategies and projects might have in terms of public value creation/ destruction. Such analyses can be done using a Public Value Scorecard as proposed by Timo Meynhardt and Peter Gomez. Public value acknowledges that established business paradigms such as customer value or stakeholder value risk overemphasizing certain aspects of business' value contribution to society at the expense of other important dimensions. It pledges for a redefinition of the entire notion of value creation as it takes utilitarian and hedonistic as well as political and moral aspects of value creation into account.

A number of firms use public value to obtain management information helping to take strategic decisions. Examples include:

Fresenius Medical Care, a German producer of medical supplies and operator of dialysis clinics, complements its balanced scorecard with the Public Value Scorecard. Through the inclusion of an external perspective the firm wants to gain a better understanding of the public value of healthcare service that are supplied by private firms. In a first project, the firm has systematically measured the public value of its dialysis centers in Great Britain. The management wants to use the insights gained in this study for positioning towards the firms' stakeholders.
The football club FC Bayern Munich uses a public value approach to systematically assess the challenges pertaining to its societal role that come along with its growth from a regionally embedded football club to a global entertainment brand. For a football club that enjoys permanent public attention and is seen as a role model by many people, such questions are especially relevant. Different public values such as "Mia san mia" (Bavarian for "us is us") and "global brand image" are partly in tension with each other. The structured compilation of the club's societal value can be used as management information for strategic decision-making.

Demarcation from related concepts
Public services – a term usually used to mean services provided by government to its citizens
Public good – a good whose availability is not reduced (non-rival) due to consumption by others, and which no one can be effectively excluded (non-excludable) from using

References

External links
 http://publicvalue.org/
 Kate Oakley, Richard Naylor and David Lee (2006), Giving them what they want: the construction of the public in 'public value', paper presented at "Media and Social Change" conference organised by the ESRC Centre for Research on Socio-Cultural Change, September 2006.
 Barry Bozeman (2002), "Public-Value Failure: When Efficient Markets May Not Do", Public Administration Review 62(2), March/April 2002
   Mark Moore's Harvard profile
 DEMOS – The Public Value of Science (2005) 
 DEMOS – Capturing Cultural Value (2005) 
 Prime Minister's Strategy Unit (2002) – Creating Public Value 
 The Center for Technology in Government 
 SAP 
 Bibliography on Public Value (English and German Literature) 
 Website of the Center for Leadership and Values in Society at the University St. Gallen 
 Public Value: Common Good and the Society. Movie by the University of St. Gallen. 
 Faulkner, N., & Kaufman, S. (2018). Avoiding theoretical stagnation: a systematic review and framework for measuring public value. Australian Journal of Public Administration, 77(1), 69-86. 

Value
Social responsibility